Larissa Werbicki (born 28 June 1996) is a Canadian rower.

Career 
Werbicki won a bronze medal at the 2014 Youth Olympics in the coxless pairs event alongside Caileigh Filmer and a silver medal at the 2014 World Rowing Junior Championships in the pairs event alongside Filmer.

She competed at the 2019 Pan American Games where she won a silver medal in the coxless pair event alongside Jessie Loutit.

In 2020, Werbicki was selected to be part of the Team Canada class of 2020-2022 at the Smith School of Business.

References

1996 births
Living people
Canadian female rowers
Rowers at the 2019 Pan American Games
Pan American Games medalists in rowing
Pan American Games silver medalists for Canada
Rowers at the 2014 Summer Youth Olympics
Sportspeople from Saskatoon
Medalists at the 2019 Pan American Games
Youth Olympic bronze medalists for Canada
21st-century Canadian women